The Japanese anime series Cowboy Bebop consists of 26 episodes, referred to as "sessions". Most episodes are named after a musical concept of some sort, usually either a broad genre (e.g. "Gateway Shuffle") or a specific song (e.g. "Honky Tonk Women" and "Bohemian Rhapsody"). The show's first run, from April 3 until June 26, 1998, on TV Tokyo, included only episodes 2, 3, 7 to 15, 18 and a special. Later that year, the series was shown in its entirety from October 24, 1998 to April 24, 1999, on the satellite network Wowow.

In the United States, the series was aired repeatedly after late 2001 on Cartoon Network's Adult Swim programming block. In its original run on Adult Swim, episodes 6, 8, and 22 were initially skipped due to their violent and destructive themes in wake of the September 11 attacks. By the third run of the series, all these episodes had premiered for the first time.

The show takes place in 2071 and follows a group of bounty hunters who hunt criminals on their ship, the Bebop. The main characters include Spike Spiegel, a laid-back former member of the Red Dragon Syndicate (a criminal organization) and hotshot ace pilot; Jet Black, a retired cop and the owner of the Bebop; Faye Valentine, a gambling-addicted amnesiac who always finds herself in financial debts; Edward Wong Hau Pepelu Tivruski IV (nicknamed "Ed"), an eccentric computer hacking prodigy from Earth; and Ein, a "data dog" as the group's pet.

A film was released in Japan in September 2001, titled Cowboy Bebop: The Movie (known in Japan as Cowboy Bebop: Knockin' on Heaven's Door). The film takes place between episodes 22 and 23.


Episode list

Film

Notes

References 

Episodes
Cowboy Bebop